Anxo may be 

 Anxo, equivalent to Angel (given name) in the Galician language or Languedocien dialect
 Anxo, another name for the Tartaro